The Toyota Camry TS-01 is a concept car based on the Toyota MCV30 Camry. It was designed and built mainly using resources of Toyota Australia, and was unveiled at the 2005 Melbourne International Motor Show in Australia.

The external and interior design were done by Toyota Style Australia, led by Paul Beranger. The concept car was named the TS-01 after Toyota's F1 drivers Jarno Trulli and Ralf Schumacher.

The aim of the Camry TS-01 was to showcase the skill of Toyota Australia designers and engineers. The Camry TS-01 is a fully functional concept car, and accelerates from 0 -  in 7.0 seconds.

In addition, the Camry TS-01 was a precursor that contributed to the launch of TRD Australia, to create performance enhanced versions of Toyota vehicles, similar to FPV (Ford), Ralliart (Mitsubishi) and HSV (Holden).

Performance changes
The Camry TS-01 features significant performance changes over the production Camry V6.

This is 28 and 12% higher than the power and torque figures of the production Camry V6 respectively. This was achieved by the inclusion of a TRD supercharger. The Camry TS-01 is a front wheel drive vehicle.

The car has a 5-speed manual transmission, together with a heavy duty clutch adapted from the Toyota Team Racing rally Corolla.

In addition to this, suspension and steering settings and geometry have been altered, while the vehicle has had its ride height reduced to the minimum ADR permitted height.

The modified ECU had been mapped in Japan by Toyota Australia engineers.

Exterior styling changes

The Camry TS-01 features a number of changes to exterior styling over the production Camry. All body parts were sourced locally in Australia.

The Camry TS-01 has exterior styling changes which include unique 14 spoke alloy wheels wrapped with Michelin Pilot Sport tires, wheel flares, unique side skirts, a unique front bumper with integrated round fog lights, a unique rear bumper with dual exhaust tips, an F1 inspired rear spoiler with a center mounted rear brake light, modified side door mirrors, and a revised grille and hood.

The Camry TS-01 is painted in a unique deep red color.

Interior styling changes
The Camry TS-01 features a dark tan suede interior trim. The driver's seat was modified to provide more support around the hips and shoulders than the production Camry. Carbon fiber surfaces were substantially used in the cabin and Optitron gauges replaced the instrumentation of the production Camry.

External links
 Toyota Camry TS-01 Performance – TS for Trulli & Schumacher
 TS-01 Concept: Toyota Flexes Muscles

Front-wheel-drive vehicles
Cars of Australia
Camry TS-01